The 2012 Giravanz Kitakyushu season sees Giravanz Kitakyushu compete in J.League Division 2 for the fourth consecutive season. Giravanz Kitakyushu are also competing in the 2012 Emperor's Cup.

Players

Competitions

J. League

League table

Matches

Emperor's Cup

References

Giravanz Kitakyushu
Giravanz Kitakyushu seasons